Clavus occiduus is a species of sea snail, a marine gastropod mollusk in the family Drilliidae.

Description

Distribution
This marine species is occurs in the demersal zone of the tropical Eastern Indian Ocean off Western Australia.

References

 Wells, F.E. 1991. A revision of the Recent Australian species of the turrid genera Clavus, Plagiostropha, and Tylotiella (Mollusca: Gastropoda). Journal of the Malacological Society of Australasia 12: 1–33 
 Wilson, B. 1994. Australian Marine Shells. Prosobranch Gastropods. Kallaroo, WA : Odyssey Publishing Vol. 2 370 pp.
 Tucker, J.K. 2004 Catalog of recent and fossil turrids (Mollusca: Gastropoda). Zootaxa 682:1–1295

External links

occiduus
Gastropods of Australia
Gastropods described in 1991